Michael Silva is an American baseball coach and former catcher, who is the current head baseball coach of the Nicholls Colonels. Silva has been a baseball coach in the South Central United States since 2003, after playing three years of college baseball at Northwestern Oklahoma State University.

Coaching career

Lower division NCAA baseball
Silva began his coaching career in 2003, as an assistant coach at Clarendon College and Bethany College. In 2007, Silva returned to Clarendon to accept his first head coaching position, later moving to Galveston College.

NCAA Division I coach
In 2013, Silva accepted his first Division I coaching position at Texas State. After a year scouting for the San Diego Padres in 2016, Silva would go on to coach at Arkansas-Little Rock and Louisiana Tech.

On July 9, 2021, Nicholls announced that Mike Silva would become the program's head coach after Seth Thibodeaux departed to take an assistant coaching position at Louisiana.

Head coaching record

References

Living people
Year of birth missing (living people)
Bethany Swedes baseball coaches
Clarendon Bulldogs baseball coaches
Galveston Whitecaps baseball coaches
Little Rock Trojans baseball coaches
Louisiana Tech Bulldogs baseball coaches
Nicholls Colonels baseball coaches
Northwestern Oklahoma State Rangers baseball players
San Diego Padres scouts
Texas State Bobcats baseball coaches
Bellevue University alumni
East Central University alumni
People from Hull, Massachusetts
Baseball coaches from Massachusetts